Chris Williamson (born May 19, 1997) is an American football cornerback who is a free agent. He played college football at Minnesota, and was selected by the New York Giants in the seventh round of the 2020 NFL Draft. He has also played for the Atlanta Falcons, Detroit Lions, and Tennessee Titans.

College career 
Williamson was rated as a 4-star recruit by Rivals, and a 3-star recruit by ESPN and 247 coming out of high school in the class 2015. He played wide receiver and defensive back in high school, but played defense at Florida. After playing in 14 games with 1 start, and making 5 tackles over his first two seasons with the Gators, Williamson transferred to the University of Minnesota. He sat out a year in 2017, in compliance with NCAA transfer rules. In his junior year, 2018, he settled into the nickelback role, where he played 11 games as a reserve, recording 34 tackles, four pass breakups, and one interception. During his senior season of 2019, he became a starter and recorded 57 tackles including four for a loss, 2.5 sacks, one interception and three pass breakups. In his career, he posted 96 total tackles, 7.5 tackles for a loss, 3.5 sacks, nine passes defensed, and two interceptions. Williamson was invited to the East-West Shrine Game.

Professional career

New York Giants
Williamson was selected by the New York Giants with the 247th pick in the seventh round of the 2020 NFL Draft. He was waived on September 5, 2020, and signed to the practice squad the next day. The Giants released Williamson on December 3, 2020.

Atlanta Falcons
On December 9, 2020, the Atlanta Falcons signed Williamson to their practice squad. He signed a reserve/future contract on January 4, 2021.

On August 31, 2021, Williamson was waived by the Falcons and re-signed to the practice squad the next day. He was promoted to the active roster on November 9. He was waived on November 30 and re-signed to the practice squad. He was released on December 7.

Detroit Lions
On December 14, 2021, Williamson was signed to the Detroit Lions practice squad. He was released on December 28.

Tennessee Titans
On January 11, 2022, Williamson signed a reserve/future contract with the Tennessee Titans. He was waived with an injury designation on August 3, 2022. He cleared waivers and was placed on injured reserve the next day. He was waived off injured reserve the day after.

References

External links
 New York Giants bio
 Minnesota Golden Gophers bio

1997 births
Living people
Players of American football from Atlanta
American football cornerbacks
Minnesota Golden Gophers football players
Florida Gators football players
New York Giants players
Atlanta Falcons players
Detroit Lions players
Tennessee Titans players